Lombo Branco is a settlement in the northeastern part of the island of Santo Antão, Cape Verde. It is situated 4 km southeast of Ribeira Grande and 17 km north of the island capital Porto Novo. 

A notable person who was born in Lombo Branco is António do Espírito Santo Fonseca who was president of the National Assembly from 1996 to 2001.

See also
List of villages and settlements in Cape Verde

References

Villages and settlements in Santo Antão, Cape Verde
Ribeira Grande Municipality